Zangulbareh (also Romanized as Zangūlbareh; also known as Zangolbareh) is a village in Machian Rural District, Kelachay District, Rudsar County, Gilan Province, Iran. At the 2006 census, its population was 71, in 21 families.

References 

Populated places in Rudsar County